Gareth John Williams (born 19 December 1978) is a former Wales international rugby union player. A hooker, he played for Cardiff Blues and was previously with his hometown club of Bridgend. He made his debut for Wales against France as a substitute in 2003. He made his first start for Wales against Scotland that same year.

On 18 January 2010 he was named in the 35 man Wales national Squad for the 2010 Six Nations tournament.

Williams retired in 2011 due to a recurring injury.

External links
Cardiff Blues profile
Bridgend profile

References

1978 births
Living people
Welsh rugby union players
Wales international rugby union players
Rugby union hookers
Cardiff Rugby players
Bridgend RFC players
Rugby union players from Bridgend
People educated at Ysgol Brynteg